The women's 100 metres hurdles event at the 2019 Asian Athletics Championships was held on 23 and 24 April.

Medalists

Results

Heats
Qualification rule: First 3 in each heat (Q) and the next 2 fastest (q) qualified for the final.

Wind:Heat 1: +1.3 m/s, Heat 2: +1.9 m/s

Final
Wind: +1.3 m/s

References

100
Sprint hurdles at the Asian Athletics Championships
2019 in women's athletics